Rafael Bianchi (born January 7, 1971 in Montevideo) is a Uruguayan former footballer who played for clubs in Uruguay, Argentina, Chile and Costa Rica.

References
 
 Profile at Tenfield Digital 

1971 births
Living people
Uruguayan footballers
Uruguayan expatriate footballers
Club Nacional de Football players
Huracán Corrientes footballers
C.S. Herediano footballers
C.A. Bella Vista players
Central Español players
Rampla Juniors players
Huracán Buceo players
Club Atlético Lanús footballers
Club Deportivo Palestino footballers
Everton de Viña del Mar footballers
Expatriate footballers in Chile
Expatriate footballers in Argentina
Expatriate footballers in Costa Rica
Association football forwards